Daphnis is an inner satellite of Saturn. Daphnis is about 8 kilometers in diameter, and orbits the planet in the Keeler Gap within the A ring.

Naming 
The moon was named in 2006 after Daphnis, a shepherd, pipes player, and pastoral poet in Greek mythology; he was descendant of the Titans, after whom the largest moons of Saturn are named. Both Daphnis and Pan, the only other known shepherd moon to orbit within Saturn's main rings, are named for mythological figures associated with shepherds.

Discovery 
Before it was photographed, the existence of a moon in Daphnis's position had already been inferred from gravitational ripples observed on the outer edge of the Keeler gap. 

The discovery of Daphnis was announced by the Cassini Imaging Science Team  on May 6, 2005. The discovery images were taken by the Cassini probe over 16 min on May 1, 2005, from a time-lapse sequence of 0.180 second narrow-angle-camera exposures of the outer edge of the A ring. The moon was subsequently found in 32 low-phase images taken of the F ring on April 13, 2005 (spanning 18 min) and again in two high-resolution (3.54 km/pixel) low-phase images taken on May 2, 2005, when its 7 km disk was resolved.

Orbit 
The inclination and eccentricity of Daphnis's orbit are very small, but distinguishable from zero. Both, particularly the inclination, are significantly greater than those of Pan (the larger moonlet which forms the Encke Gap). Daphnis's eccentricity causes its distance from Saturn to vary by ~9 km, and its inclination causes it to move up and down by ~17 km.  The Keeler Gap, within which Daphnis orbits, is about 42 km wide.

Effect on Saturn's rings 

Daphnis orbits within the Keeler gap in Saturn's rings. As it orbits, it creates gravitational ripples on the edges of the gap as ring particles are attracted toward the moon and then fall back down toward the ring. The waves made by the moon in the inner edge of the gap precede it in orbit, while those on the outer edge lag behind it, due to the differences in relative orbital speed. In a photograph taken on January 18, 2017, a tendril of ring particles can be seen to extend toward the moon; according to JPL, "this may have resulted from a moment when Daphnis drew a packet of material out of the ring, and now that packet is spreading itself out."

Physical characteristics 
On January 18, 2017, Daphnis was photographed from a sufficiently close distance to reveal its shape. The moon was discovered to be an irregularly-shaped object with a mostly smooth surface, a few craters, and an equatorial ridge.

References

External links

 Discovery images of Daphnis at the CICLOPS web site (includes a movie of the moon's ripple effect) 
 
 Photos of Daphnis from the CICLOPS web site

Moons of Saturn
20050506
Moons with a prograde orbit